Bannow is a village and civil parish lying east of Bannow Bay on the south-west coast of County Wexford, Ireland. In modern times the main settlement is the village of Carrig-on-Bannow (or Carrig). In Norman times there was a borough called Bannow on Bannow Island at the mouth of the Bay.  This town has since disappeared, probably due to the silting up of the natural harbour channels in the 14th century, and the former island is now attached to the rest of the parish.

History

It is believed that the Vikings had a strong early presence in the area, due to the survival of numerous Norse place-names in the locality. The Norman conquest of Ireland began in Bannow Bay in 1169, when three ships commanded by Robert Fitz-Stephen arrived at the behest of Diarmait MacMurrough to support his claim to the Kingdom of Leinster. Another group of Normans under Raymond le Gros landed the following year on the far side of Bannow Bay, on the Hook Peninsula at Baginbun, which was then called . There was a small promontory fort there, easy for the Normans to defend and thereby ensure a safe landing.

At Bannow Island, the ruins can still be seen of the 13th-century Norman Romanesque parish church of St Mary, originally impropriated to the monks of Canterbury. It consists of a nave and chancel. Another famous Norman soldier and officer who landed in the first invasion was Meiler Fitzhenry, whose son adopted his father's name, and thus began the Meyler family of County Wexford, who later were prominent in the Wexford Rebellion of 1798.

Bannow Borough was a borough constituency returning two members to the Parliament of Ireland until the Act of Union 1800 disenfranchised it. It was a pocket borough with the same proprietor and electors as Clonmines Borough, another rotten borough for the deserted town of Clonmines at the northern limit of Bannow Bay. The most prominent local landlords in Bannow from the late 17th century were the Boyse family, who lived at Bannow House. The last member of the Boyse family left the area in 1948.

During the Irish Rebellion of 1798, the fleeing loyalist garrison of the town of Wexford crossed the nearby Scar at Barrystown on their way to Duncannon Fort. In the late 19th century, the area was heavily involved in the Land Wars.

Geography

Bannow is a Roman Catholic parish in the Diocese of Ferns. The parish church in Carrig-on-Bannow was first built in 1856 and has been altered several times since. It has an adjoining cemetery. Carrig also has a national school, Garda Station, handball alley, post office, a café, four estates, a doctor's office, a farm, a corner shop, two bars, and public houses. A kilometre away is an Anglican church at Balloughton, and at nearby Grantstown is an Augustinian priory. There are beaches on Bannow Island, at Cockle Strand, Blackhall, and Cullenstown.

Transport
Wexford Local Link route 388 serves Carrig-on-Bannow several times daily linking it to Wexford. Bus Éireann route 381 serves Carrig-on-Bannow and Blackhall on Tuesdays providing a link to and from Wexford. Several buses a day serve Wellingtonbridge around 5 kilometres distant. Until September 2010 Wellingtonbridge was also served by rail.

Sport
The local Gaelic Athletic Association club is Bannow-Ballymitty GAA Club, which has pitches located at Grantstown. The club has two pitches, a stand and an indoor complex with an upstairs viewing area. The adult men's GAA teams currently play junior hurling and intermediate football.

Camogie and Ladies football clubs also reside and use the facilities there. Bannow-Ballymitty Camogie Club was founded in 1950 and was originally called St. Mary's. It ceased in the mid-1960s and reformed in 1992 as Bannow-Ballymitty.

Nearby is Corach Ramblers soccer club.  Handball is also played at Ballymitty Handball Club.

Music
Formed locally, the Danescastle Music Group (Bannow Comhaltas Ceoltóirí Éireann) had over 150 pupils as of 2010. It is a County Wexford branch of Comhaltas Ceoltóirí Éireann (Comhaltas). Other members of Comhaltas in the parish include the Gleeson family, the Murphy Bros, Sean Stafford, Nick Bennett and many more traditional musicians and singers.

Colfers pub is a venue for traditional sessions, and the "Phil Murphy Weekend" is held every year in Carrig on Bannow.

People
Anna Maria Hall (Mrs. S.C. Hall) – author.
Ben Brosnan – Gaelic footballer.

References

Towns and villages in County Wexford
Civil parishes of County Wexford
Geography of Ireland
Viking Age in Ireland
Former islands of Ireland